The 1966 Norwegian Football Cup was the 61st edition of the Norwegian annual knockout football tournament. The Cup was won by Fredrikstad after beating Lyn in the cup final with the score 3–2. This was Fredrikstad's ninth Norwegian Cup title.

Third round

|colspan="3" style="background-color:#97DEFF"|31 July 1966

|-
|colspan="3" style="background-color:#97DEFF"|1 August 1966

|-
|colspan="3" style="background-color:#97DEFF"|2 August 1966

|-
|colspan="3" style="background-color:#97DEFF"|3 August 1966

|-
|colspan="3" style="background-color:#97DEFF"|Replay: 10 August 1966

|}

Fourth round

|colspan="3" style="background-color:#97DEFF"|21 August 1966

|-
|colspan="3" style="background-color:#97DEFF"|Replay: 31 August 1966

|}

Quarter-finals

|colspan="3" style="background-color:#97DEFF"|4 September 1966

|}

Semi-finals

|colspan="3" style="background-color:#97DEFF"|2 October 1966

|}

Final

Fredrikstad's winning team: Per Mosgaard, Kjell Andreassen, Jan Hermansen, Arne Pedersen, Hans Jacob Mathisen, Roar Johansen, Bjørn Borgen, Tore Hansen, Per Kristoffersen, Thor Spydevold and Jan Aas.

Lyn's team: Svein Bjørn Olsen, Harald Berg, Jan Berg, Arild Gulden, Knut Kolle, Andreas Morisbak, Jan Rodvang, Kjell Saga, Ole Stavrum, Einar With and Svein Bredo Østlien.

References
http://www.rsssf.no

Norwegian Football Cup seasons
Norway
Football Cup